Flayed Disciple is a British death metal/thrash metal band from Taunton, Somerset, England. Formed in 2008,  They have released one album and three EPs. Their debut album, Death Hammer, was recorded in February 2012 at Foel Studio, Wales, with producer Chris Fielding. They are signed to Bethlam Records.  

In July, 2010, Flayed Disciple won Bloodstock Open Air's Metal 2 The Masses competition in Bournemouth. That won them a place on the New Blood Stage at Bloodstock Open Air Festival, in Derby. They were then invited back to Bloodstock Open Air to play on the bigger Sophie Lancaster stage in 2012.

The band first met in 2008, and recorded the Drawn Viscera EP in the summer of that year. The 2010 Ejaculate While Killing EP was recorded in Bristol with producer Chuck Creese, from the band Burning Skies. Flayed Disciple had a presence in music magazines such as Metal Hammer, Terrorizer and Zero Tolerance. Many live reviews can be found on the internet.

Their album Death Hammer was released on 28 May 2012 by the Irish record label, Grindscene Records. There are many reviews online and in print.

A 12" vinyl was recorded in March 2014, and released independently on Flayed Disciple's own label - Bethlam Records. Flayed Disciple are still active as of 2022.

Musical style and reception
The music of Flayed Disciple is composed by every band member; the lyrics on Death Hammer were written by Tolfree and Whyte. Their lyrical content has come up against some controversy in recent times, as the themes of serial killers, rape, murder, paedophilia and atheism feature in most songs. The musical style is heavily influenced by the early 1980s thrash metal scene from the Bay Area of California. Bands such as Megadeth, Metallica and Slayer are the reason they started writing music. Recently, heavier bands such as Cannibal Corpse, Demolition Hammer, Napalm Death and Deicide have also influenced their musical style.

Flayed Disciple did not have a bass player for three years after former bassist (and original member) Nathan Bartley left the band in 2009, to become a full-time hippie. The bass parts on the Ejaculate While Killing EP were recorded by lead guitarist Thurston Howe. They recruited Welsh bass player Paul Williams at the end of 2011, completing the line up ready to record their first album.

The touring for Death Hammer took the band as far as India, playing at an open-air festival alongside French band Gojira. They also toured across Europe with Vader in January 2013.

Band members 
Current
Thurston Howe - guitar (2008-)
Jon Whitfield - guitar (2008-)
Phil Tolfree - drums (2008-)
Paul Williams - bass (2011-)
Merv Hembrough - Vocals (2021-)

Past members
Nath Stevens - bass (2008-2009)
Rich Lewis - drums (2013-2014)
Tim Whyte - vocals (2008-2019)

Discography 
Albums
 Death Hammer (2012)
EPs
 A Hell In Living Flesh (2022)
 Flayed Disciple Vinyl (2014)
 Self Titled (2010)
 Drawn Viscera (2008)

References 

Musical quartets
English death metal musical groups
English thrash metal musical groups
Musical groups established in 2008